Gregory Brent Blosser (born June 26, 1971) is a former outfielder in Major League Baseball (MLB) who briefly played for the Boston Red Sox during the  and  seasons as part of a 15-year career in professional baseball.

Biography 
Born in Manatee County, Florida, Blosser was taken by Boston with their first-round pick in the 1989 Major League Baseball draft out of Sarasota High School. His brief trial with the 1993–1994 Red Sox came after he slugged 23 homers for Triple–A Pawtucket in 1992. In his 22-game MLB career, he collected two singles and a double and six bases on balls in 45 plate appearances, hitting .077 and collecting two runs batted in.

He later appeared in 208 games for two clubs in the independent Atlantic League.

He currently runs a private detective agency and has many investments in real estate in both Florida and Japan.

External links

Retrosheet

1971 births
Living people
American expatriate baseball people in Japan
Baseball players from Florida
Boston Red Sox players
Durham Bulls players
Fresno Grizzlies players
Gulf Coast Red Sox players
Lancaster Barnstormers players
Lynchburg Red Sox players
Major League Baseball left fielders
New Britain Red Sox players
Oklahoma City 89ers players
Pawtucket Red Sox players
Rochester Red Wings players
St. Petersburg Devil Rays players
Sarasota High School alumni
Seibu Lions players
Somerset Patriots players
Sportspeople from Sarasota, Florida
Trenton Thunder players
Winter Haven Red Sox players